Schlierach is a river of Bavaria, Germany. It is the outflow of the Schliersee, and flows into the Mangfall near Weyarn.

See also
List of rivers of Bavaria

References

Rivers of Bavaria
Rivers of Germany